The following is a list of current and former forts in Nebraska.

See also
 History of Nebraska
 Landmarks of the Nebraska Territory
 Department of the Platte

 
Landmarks in Nebraska
Lists of buildings and structures in Nebraska
Tourism in Nebraska
Nebraska